The Washington Red Birds was the predominant name of  a minor league baseball team located in Washington, Pennsylvania between 1934 and 1942. The Red Birds played in the Pennsylvania State Association. Known as the Washington Generals in 1934 and 1935, the team was affiliated with the New York Yankees. After a four-year hiatus, the Red Birds represented Washington in the league, as an affiliate of the St. Louis Cardinals.  The team and the league both disbanded in 1942, due to the strains of World War II.

Notable alumni
Joe Beggs
Benny Bengough
Don Bollweg
Howie Gorman
Hal Gregg
Bill Kalfass
Dutch Mele
Mike Milosevich
Bob Scheffing
Dick Sisler
Pete Suder
George Washburn

References

Baseball teams established in 1934
Baseball teams disestablished in 1942
Defunct minor league baseball teams
New York Yankees minor league affiliates
St. Louis Cardinals minor league affiliates
1934 establishments in Pennsylvania
1942 disestablishments in Pennsylvania
Defunct baseball teams in Pennsylvania
Pennsylvania State Association teams